This is a list of defunct airlines of Zimbabwe.

See also
 List of airlines of Zimbabwe
 List of airports in Zimbabwe

References

Zimbabwe
Airlines
Airlines, defunct
Airlines